Wellcome Research Laboratories was a site in Beckenham, south-east London, that was a main research centre for pharmaceuticals. Until 1965, this laboratory site was situated in Kent.

History
In 1894 Henry Wellcome set up a laboratory in central London to investigate a treatment for diphtheria. In 1898 it moved to Brockwell Hall in Herne Hill (now in Lambeth). In 1919 Henry Wellcome bought a 105-acre site in Beckenham, Kent, which cost £32,000. The site had belonged to the Langley family since 1350. Langley Court had been built in 1886 by James Bucknall, who lived in the house with his family until 1914.

It was named the Wellcome Research Laboratories in 1946 after the Wellcome Chemical Research Laboratories moved to the site. The Wellcome Trust had been set up in 1936, after the death in that year of Sir Henry Wellcome.

They have developed the antibiotic trimethoprim.

Awards
In April 1990, the site won the Queen's Award for Export and Technological Achievement for their Retrovir drug (Zidovudine), an antiretroviral medication; it had been launched in 1987 as AZT, and was the world's first antiretroviral medication. This medication caused the Wellcome share price to increase in 1989 by five times.

Closure
It closed in 1995 after Wellcome had been taken over by Glaxo in March 1995 to form Glaxo Wellcome. In December 2000, Glaxo Wellcome became GlaxoSmithKline, when it merged with SmithKline Beecham.

Directors
 Sir Salvador Moncada FRS 1986-95

Alumni
 Adrien Albert
June Almeida
 Sir James Black FRS, winner of the 1988 Nobel Prize for Medicine
 Victor Darley-Usmar
 Trevor M Jones
 Charles Kellaway FRS
 Gilberto de Nucci
 Alan R. Saltiel
 Sir Patrick Vallance FRS, Chief Scientific Adviser to UK Government since 2018
 Sir John Vane FRS, winner of the 1982 Nobel Prize for Medicine
 John L. Wallace

See also
 Wellcome Research Institute, in central London
 Wellcome Trust Centre for Human Genetics, in Oxford
 Wellcome Trust Centre for Stem Cell Research, in Cambridge
 Wellcome Trust Sanger Institute, in Cambridgeshire

References

External links
 Wellcome Research history

1894 establishments in England
1995 disestablishments in England
Former buildings and structures in the London Borough of Bromley
Laboratories in the United Kingdom
Medical research institutes in the United Kingdom
Pharmaceutical industry in the United Kingdom
Pharmaceutical research institutes
Research institutes in London
Wellcome Trust
Pharmaceutical companies established in 1894
British companies established in 1894
British companies disestablished in 1995